The Story of Kang-goo is a 2014 South Korean two-part SBS romance television drama starring Lee Dong-wook, Park Joo-mi and Shin Dong-woo.

Plot

Cast
Lee Dong-wook as Kim Kyung-tae
Park Joo-mi as Yang Moon-sook
Shin Dong-woo as Lee Kang-gu

Notes
The Story of Kang-goo is SBS first 3D drama in South Korea as well as the world. It was produced in dual stream with LG.

References

External links
 

Seoul Broadcasting System television dramas
South Korean romance television series
Korean-language television shows
2014 South Korean television series debuts
2014 South Korean television series endings